Centurian may refer to:
A frequent misspelling for "Centurion"
Centurian, an album by Idris Ackamoor
City Centurian, a game software for the Apple II
Centurian (grape), a California wine grape
The Centurians, musical group

Similar spellings
Centurion, a professional officer of the Royal Roma army
Centurion (disambiguation)
Centenarian, a one-hundred-year-old person